Olpiseius is a genus of mites in the Phytoseiidae family.

Species
 Olpiseius djarradjin Beard, 2001
 Olpiseius noncollyerae (Schicha, 1987)
 Olpiseius perthae (McMurtry & Schicha, 1987)

References

Phytoseiidae